Araras is a municipality located in the interior of State of São Paulo, Brazil. The population is 135,506 as of the 2020 IBGE estimate.

Etymology
Araras means macaws.

Sports
União São João Esporte Clube, founded in 1981, is the most successful football club of the city.

Notable people
Alice Piffer Canabrava, economic historian
Thiago Andrade, Soccer Player

References

 
Populated places established in 1862
1862 establishments in Brazil